= Qiang Ji =

Qiang Ji from the Rensselaer Polytechnic Institute, Troy, New York, United States, was named Fellow of the Institute of Electrical and Electronics Engineers (IEEE) in 2015 for contributions to automatic facial image processing and affective computing.
